Juramento is a station on Line D of the Buenos Aires Underground. It is located at the intersection of Cabildo and Juramento avenues. The station was opened on 21 June 1999 as the western terminus of the extension of the line from José Hernández. On 27 April 2000, the line was extended further west to Congreso de Tucumán.

References

External links

Buenos Aires Underground stations
1999 establishments in Argentina